Chiasmocleis carvalhoi is a species of frog in the family Microhylidae. It is found in Colombia, Peru, and Brazil. Its natural habitats are subtropical or tropical dry forests or moist lowland forests and intermittent freshwater marshes. It is threatened by habitat loss from farming and logging.

References

 
 IUCN, Conservation International, and NatureServe. 2004. Global Amphibian Assessment. <www.globalamphibians.org>. Accessed on 21 February 2008.

Chiasmocleis
Amphibians of Brazil
Amphibians of Colombia
Amphibians of Peru
Taxonomy articles created by Polbot
Amphibians described in 1975